In enzymology, a CDP-diacylglycerol—inositol 3-phosphatidyltransferase is an enzyme that catalyzes the chemical reaction

CDP-diacylglycerol + myo-inositol  CMP + phosphatidyl-1D-myo-inositol

Thus, the two substrates of this enzyme are CDP-diacylglycerol and myo-inositol, whereas its two products are CMP and phosphatidyl-1D-myo-inositol.

This enzyme belongs to the family of transferases, specifically those transferring non-standard substituted phosphate groups.  The systematic name of this enzyme class is CDP-diacylglycerol:myo-inositol 3-phosphatidyltransferase. Other names in common use include CDP-diglyceride-inositol phosphatidyltransferase, phosphatidylinositol synthase, CDP-diacylglycerol-inositol phosphatidyltransferase, CDP-diglyceride:inositol transferase, cytidine 5'-diphospho-1,2-diacyl-sn-glycerol:myo-inositol, 3-phosphatidyltransferase, CDP-DG:inositol transferase, cytidine diphosphodiglyceride-inositol phosphatidyltransferase, CDP-diacylglycerol:myo-inositol-3-phosphatidyltransferase, CDP-diglyceride-inositol transferase, cytidine diphosphoglyceride-inositol phosphatidyltransferase, and cytidine diphosphoglyceride-inositol transferase.  This enzyme participates in glycerophospholipid metabolism and phosphatidylinositol signaling system.

References

 
 
 
 

EC 2.7.8
Enzymes of unknown structure